Melanie Twitt (born 7 October 1977) is an Australian field hockey player who competed in the 2004 Summer Olympics and in the 2008 Summer Olympics.

References

External links
 

1977 births
Living people
Australian female field hockey players
Olympic field hockey players of Australia
Field hockey players at the 2004 Summer Olympics
Field hockey players at the 2008 Summer Olympics
Commonwealth Games medallists in field hockey
Commonwealth Games gold medallists for Australia
Commonwealth Games bronze medallists for Australia
Field hockey players at the 2002 Commonwealth Games
Medallists at the 2002 Commonwealth Games